Sandra Hermida Muñiz (born 22 July 1972) is a Spanish film producer and production manager. She has produced more than 30 domestic and international films, such as The Impatient Alchemist (2002), The Orphanage (2007), The Impossible (2012), and A Monster Calls (2016).

Career
Sandra Hermida Muñiz holds a licentiate in image and sound from the Complutense University of Madrid. She began her film career in 1998 as coordinator of the film La primera noche de mi vida, directed by Miguel Albaladejo.

She has been a producer on numerous films, such as The Impatient Alchemist by Patricia Ferreira, and The Orphanage, The Impossible, and A Monster Calls by J. A. Bayona. Her other film credits include Marrowbone, Aloft, Carmina y amén, La torre de Suso, Return to Hansala, Mediterranean Food, Spanish Movie, and Biutiful.

In addition, Hermida is a co-founder and director of Colosé Producciones, which she set up in 2004 with assistant director Javier Soto. Films produced by her company include 9 días en Haití, a short documentary by Oxfam Intermón, I Hate New York, and Mirage.

Filmography

Awards
Hermida won Goya Awards for Best Production for The Orphanage (2007), The Impossible (2012), and A Monster Calls (2016), as well as one for Best Documentary Film for Garbo: The Spy in 2010. In 2013, she won for Outstanding Supporting Visual Effects in a Feature Motion Picture at the Visual Effects Society Awards for The Impossible. In 2017, she won the Gaudí Award for Best Production for A Monster Calls.

References

External links
 
 Colosé Producciones at Facebook

1972 births
Complutense University of Madrid alumni
Film producers from Madrid
Goya Award winners
Living people
Spanish women film producers